A sitcom, a portmanteau of situation comedy, or situational comedy, is a genre of comedy centered on a fixed set of characters who mostly carry over from episode to episode. Sitcoms can be contrasted with sketch comedy, where a troupe may use new characters in each sketch, and stand-up comedy, where a comedian tells jokes and stories to an audience. Sitcoms originated in radio, but today are found mostly on television as one of its dominant narrative forms.

A situation comedy television program may be recorded in front of a studio audience, depending on the program's production format. The effect of a live studio audience can be imitated or enhanced by the use of a laugh track.

Critics disagree over the utility of the term "sitcom" in classifying shows that have come into existence since the turn of the century. Many contemporary American sitcoms use the single-camera setup and do not feature a laugh track, thus often resembling the dramedy shows of the 1980s and 1990s rather than the traditional sitcom.

History 

The terms "situation comedy" or "sitcom" were not commonly used until the 1950s. There were prior examples on radio, but the first television sitcom is said to be Pinwright's Progress, ten episodes being broadcast on the BBC in the United Kingdom between 1946 and 1947. In the United States, director and producer William Asher has been credited with being the "man who invented the sitcom", having directed over two dozen of the leading sitcoms, including I Love Lucy, from the 1950s through the 1970s.

By country

Australia 

There have been few long-running Australian-made sitcoms, but many US and UK sitcoms have been successful there. Sitcoms are a staple of government broadcaster Australian Broadcasting Corporation (ABC); in the 1970s and 1980s many UK sitcoms also screened on the Seven Network. By 1986, UK comedies Bless This House and Are You Being Served? had been repeated by ABC Television several times, and were then acquired and screened by the Seven Network, in prime time.

In 1981, Daily at Dawn was the first Australian comedy series to feature a regular gay character (Terry Bader as journalist Leslie).

In 1987, Mother and Son was winner of the Television Drama Award presented by the Australian Human Rights Commission.

In 2007, Kath & Kims first episode of series four attracted an Australian audience of 2.521 million nationally, the highest rating ever for a first episode in the history of Australian television, until the series premiere of Underbelly: A Tale of Two Cities in 2009 with 2.58 million viewers.

In 2013, Please Like Me received an invitation to screen at the Series Mania Television Festival in Paris, was praised by critics  and has garnered numerous awards and nominations.
Also in 2013, At Home With Julia was criticised by several social commentators as inappropriately disrespectful to the office of Prime Minister,
the show nevertheless proved very popular both with television audiences — becoming the most watched Australian scripted comedy series of 2011 — and with television critics. Nominated to the 2012 Australian Academy of Cinema and Television Arts Awards for Best Television Comedy Series.

Canada 

Although there have been a number of notable exceptions, Canadian television networks have generally fared poorly with their sitcom offerings, with relatively few Canadian sitcoms attaining notable success in Canada or internationally. Canadian television has had much greater success with sketch comedy and dramedy series.

The popular show King of Kensington aired from 1975 to 1980, drawing an average of 1.5 to 1.8 million viewers weekly at its peak.

Corner Gas, which ran for six seasons from 2004 to 2009, became an instant hit, averaging a million viewers per episode. It has been the recipient of six Gemini Awards, and has been nominated almost 70 times for various awards.

Other noteworthy recent sitcoms have included Call Me Fitz, Schitt's Creek, Letterkenny and Kim's Convenience, all of which have been winners of the Canadian Screen Award for Best Comedy Series.

India 

Sitcoms started appearing on Indian television in the 1980s, with serials like Yeh Jo Hai Zindagi (1984), Nukkad (1986)  and Wagle Ki Duniya (1988) on the state-run Doordarshan channel. Gradually, as private channels were allowed, many more sitcoms followed in the 1990s, such as Dekh Bhai Dekh (1993), Zabaan Sambhalke (1993), Shrimaan Shrimati (1995), Office Office (2001), Ramani Vs Ramani (2001), Amrutham (Telugu 2001–2007), Khichdi (2002), Sarabhai vs Sarabhai (2005) to F.I.R. (2006–2015), Taarak Mehta Ka Ooltah Chashmah (2008–present), Uppum Mulakum (Malayalam 2015–present), and Bhabiji Ghar Par Hain (2015–present). SAB TV is one of the leading channels of India dedicated entirely to Sitcoms.

Taarak Mehta Ka Ooltah Chashmah is the longest running sitcom of Indian television and is known as the flagship show of SAB TV.

Mexico 

El Chavo del Ocho, which ran from 1971 to 1980, was the most watched show in the Mexican television and had a Latin American audience of 350 million viewers per episode at its peak of popularity during the mid-1970s. The show continues to be popular in Hispanic America as well as in Brazil, Spain, the United States, and other countries, with syndicated episodes averaging 91 million daily viewers in all of the markets where it is distributed in the Americas. Since it ceased production in 1992, the show has earned an estimated billion in syndication fees alone for Televisa.

New Zealand 

Gliding On, a popular sitcom in New Zealand in the early 1980s, won multiple awards over the course of its run, including Best Comedy, Best Drama and Best Direction at the Feltex Awards.

Russia 

The first Russian sitcom series was "Strawberry" (resembled "Duty Pharmacy" in Spanish format), which was aired in 1996–1997 on the RTR channel. However, the "boom" of Russian sitcoms began only in the 2000s — when in 2004, the STS started very successful sitcom "My Fair Nanny" (an adaptation of the American sitcom "The Nanny"). Since that time sitcoms in Russia were produced by the two largest entertainment channels of the country — STS and TNT. In 2007 the STS released the first original domestic sitcom — "Daddy's Daughters" (there were only adaptation before), and in 2010 TNT released "Interns" — the first sitcom, filmed as a comedy (unlike dominated "conveyor" sitcoms).

United Kingdom 

Although styles of sitcom have changed over the years they tend to be based on a family, workplace or other institution, where the same group of contrasting characters is brought together in each episode. British sitcoms are typically produced in one or more series of six episodes. Most such series are conceived and developed by one or two writers. The majority of British sitcoms are 30 minutes long and are recorded on studio sets in a multiple-camera setup. A subset of British comedy consciously avoids traditional situation comedy themes and storylines to branch out into more unusual topics or narrative methods. Blackadder (1983–1989) and Yes Minister/Yes Prime Minister (1980–1988, 2013) moved what is often a domestic or workplace genre into the corridors of power. A later development was the mockumentary in such series as The Office (2001–2003, 2013). Also coming of age in such series as The Inbetweeners (2008-2010).

United States 

The sitcom format was born in January 1926 with the initial broadcast of Sam 'n' Henry on WGN radio in Chicago, Illinois. The 15-minute daily program was revamped in 1928, moved to another station, renamed Amos 'n' Andy, and became one of the most successful sitcoms of the period. It was also one of the earliest examples of radio syndication. In 1947, the first American television sitcom, Mary Kay and Johnny, debuted. Since that time, many of the most watched shows in the US have been sitcoms.

American sitcoms are generally written to run a total of 22 minutes in length, leaving eight minutes for advertisements in a 30 minute timeslot.

Some popular British shows have been successfully adapted for the US. Some of the most successful American sitcoms of the 1970s, including All in the Family, Three's Company, and Sanford and Son, were adapted from British productions.

Iran 
On Tiptoes and Shabhaye Barareh They were among the first and most important sitcoms that led to the growth of this type of comedy in Iran,the idea of ​​making On Tiptoes was borrowed from the series Friends

See also 

 Black sitcom
 List of sitcoms
Animated sitcom

References

Further reading 
 Lewisohn, Mark (2003) Radio Times' Guide to TV Comedy. 2nd Ed. Revised – BBC Consumer Publishing. , Provides details of every comedy show ever seen on British television, including imports.
 Padva, Gilad (2005) Desired Bodies and Queer Masculinities in Three Popular TV Sitcoms. In Lorek-Jezinska, Edyta and Wieckowska, Katarzyna (Eds.), Corporeal Inscriptions: Representations of the Body in Cultural and Homosexual Literature  (pp. 127–138). Torun, Poland: Nicholas Copernicus University Press. 
 Asplin, Richard (2004) Gagged – A Thriller With Jokes – Arrow books.  is a contemporary comic thriller set in London and Los Angeles that covers the financing, production, creation, ratings and marketing of a modern American network half-hour situation comedy
 
 
 
 
 
 Starman, Ray "The Sitcom Class Wars:20th Century". (2014) The Troy Bookmakers, Troy NY.  History and analysis of 60 classic American sitcoms.  Also includes glossary for easy access.  Photos for every program.

External links 
Situation Comedy Bibliography (via UC Berkeley)—mostly USA programs.
 Sitcoms Online
 British Comedy Guide

 
Television genres
Television terminology